James Hewitt (born 1958) is a British army officer, former lover of Diana, Princess of Wales.

James Hewitt may also refer to:

James Hewitt, 1st Viscount Lifford (1712–1789), Anglo-Irish lawyer and judge
James Hewitt, 2nd Viscount Lifford (1750–1830), Anglo-Irish peer and clergyman, and his son James, 3rd Viscount
James Hewitt, 4th Viscount Lifford (1811–1887),
James Hewitt (musician) (1770–1827), composer and conductor
Jamie Hewitt (cricketer) (born 1976), English cricketer
Jamie Hewitt (footballer) (born 1968)
Jim Hewitt (born 1933), Canadian politician